Andrew Miller Aikman (9 April 1885 — 14 April 1959) was a Scottish first-class cricketer.

Aikman was born at Galashiels in April 1885. During the First World War he served as a seaman in the Royal Navy. Following the war, Aikman played one first-class cricket match as a wicket-keeper for Scotland against Ireland at Dublin in 1921. Batting once in the match, he was dismissed for a single run in the Scotland first innings by William Harrington. In club cricket he played for Gala Cricket Club, and by profession he was a commercial traveller in textiles. Aikman died at Galashiels in April 1959.

References

External links
 

1885 births
1959 deaths
People from Galashiels
Royal Navy sailors
Royal Navy personnel of World War I
Scottish cricketers